The Bloodhound Site (16-WF-21) is an archaeological site in West Feliciana Parish, Louisiana, United States. It was once occupied by the Tunica tribe from 1700 to 1749.

References

External links
Indian Mounds Louisiana

Archaeological sites in Louisiana
Geography of West Feliciana Parish, Louisiana
Archaeological sites on the National Register of Historic Places in Louisiana
National Register of Historic Places in West Feliciana Parish, Louisiana